Domantas Šeskus (born 2 December 1992) is a Lithuanian professional basketball player. He is the older son of coach Virginijus Šeškus.

References

External links
 Domantas Šeskus LKL.lt profile (English and Lithuanian)
 Domantas Šeskus BBL.net profile (English)

1992 births
BC Prienai players
Living people
Lithuanian men's basketball players
People from Prienai
Guards (basketball)